Javeria Khan Wadood (born 14 May 1988) is a Pakistani cricketer who plays as an all-rounder, batting right-handed and bowling right-arm off break. She has played international cricket for Pakistan since 2008. She has also played domestic cricket for Karachi and Zarai Taraqiati Bank Limited.

International career
Javeria made her one-day debut against Sri Lanka on 6 May 2008. In October 2018, she was named in Pakistan's squad for the 2018 ICC Women's World Twenty20 tournament in the West Indies. Later the same month, she was named as the captain of the side, after Bismah Maroof stepped down from the role. Ahead of the tournament, she was named as one of the players to watch. She was the leading run-scorer for Pakistan in the tournament, with 136 runs in four matches.

In September 2010, Javeria was selected to play in the 2010 Asian Games in China. In November 2019, during the series against Bangladesh, she became the third female cricketer for Pakistan to play in 100 WODIs. In January 2020, she was named in Pakistan's squad for the 2020 ICC Women's T20 World Cup in Australia. She was the leading run-scorer for Pakistan in the tournament, with 82 runs in four matches.

In December 2020, Khan was named the captain of Pakistan's squad for their tour to South Africa, after Bismah Maroof withdrew from the tour due to family reasons. Later the same month, she was shortlisted as one of the Women's Cricketer of the Year for the 2020 PCB Awards. In October 2021, she was named as the captain of Pakistan's team for the 2021 Women's Cricket World Cup Qualifier tournament in Zimbabwe. In January 2022, she was named in Pakistan's team for the 2022 Women's Cricket World Cup in New Zealand.

References

External links
 

1988 births
Living people
Muhajir people
Cricketers from Karachi
Pakistani women cricketers
Pakistan women One Day International cricketers
Pakistan women Twenty20 International cricketers
Karachi women cricketers
Zarai Taraqiati Bank Limited women cricketers
Asian Games gold medalists for Pakistan
Asian Games medalists in cricket
Cricketers at the 2010 Asian Games
Cricketers at the 2014 Asian Games
Medalists at the 2010 Asian Games
Medalists at the 2014 Asian Games